Eduardo Maciel de Barros (born 8 March 1985) is a Brazilian football coach. He is the current assistant coach of Fluminense.

Career
Born in Campinas, São Paulo, Barros began his career with Paulínia, working from the under-11s to the under-19s before moving to Novorizontino in 2012. He then worked at Atlético Paranaense's under-13 squad and Coritiba's under-19s before being appointed Fernando Diniz's assistant at Audax on 9 December 2015.

Barros continued to work with Diniz in the following years, being his assistant at Oeste, Audax and Atlético. In June 2018, as Diniz was sacked, Barros remained at Atlético, being named Kelly's assistant at the under-23 side. The following 8 March, however, he was appointed coach of the under-19s.

On 5 November 2019, Barros was named interim coach of the main squad in the Série A, after the departure of Tiago Nunes. His first professional match occurred the following day, a 0–0 home draw against Cruzeiro.

On 4 December 2019, Barros was confirmed as coach of the under-23s for the ensuing Campeonato Paranaense. He returned to an interim status after the dismissal of Dorival Júnior, but was released by the club on 22 October 2020.

On 4 February 2021, Barros was named Marquinhos Santos' assistant at Juventude, newly promoted to the top tier.

References

External links

1985 births
Living people
Sportspeople from Campinas
Brazilian football managers
Campeonato Brasileiro Série A managers
Club Athletico Paranaense managers
Esporte Clube Juventude managers